Wythop is a civil parish in the Borough of Allerdale in Cumbria, England.  It contains six listed buildings that are recorded in the National Heritage List for England.  All the listed buildings are designated at Grade II, the lowest of the three grades, which is applied to "buildings of national importance and special interest".  The parish is in the Lake District National Park and is entirely rural.  The listed buildings are houses, farmhouses, farm buildings, a public house, and a former mill.


Buildings

References

Citations

Sources

Lists of listed buildings in Cumbria